Shin Saw was the chief queen consort of King Minkhaung I of Ava from 1400 to 1422.  The royal chronicles identify her as Hsinbyushin ("Lord of the White Elephant").

Brief
Her stone inscription dated 28 February 1409 states that she was the chief queen consort of Minkhaung I, and that she was a granddaughter of King Swa Saw Ke and his two senior queens (Queen of the Southern Palace and the Queen of the Northern Palace). The inscription continues that the two queen grandmothers were sisters of King Thado Minbya, which means they were Shin Saw Gyi of Sagaing and Saw Omma of Sagaing. It also means her parents, who were not explicitly named neither in the inscription nor in the chronicles, were first cousins. If the list of children of her two grandmothers given in the Hmannan Yazawin chronicle is accurate and complete, her parents were most probably Kyawswa and Saw Myat Ke.

Saw became the chief queen of Minkhaung I, her half-uncle, at his accession in 1400. Her two younger sisters Saw Khway and Min Pyan were also married to the new king. She had no children.

Notes

References

Bibliography
 
 

Chief queens consort of Ava
14th-century Burmese women
15th-century Burmese women